Resolution is the BoDeans' 7th full-length studio album. It was released on June 22, 2004 and was the first album of new material from the band in 8 years.

Reception
Music critic Ronnie D. Lankford, Jr., writing for AllMusic, said the album "finds the BoDeans in good form as the band revisits its distinct brand of Americana, and will be eagerly sought after by fans."

Track listing
 "If It Makes You"
 "Marianne"
 "(We Can) Live"
 "Wild World"
 "Nobody Loves Me"
 "Crazy"
 "Two Souls"
 "Said Hello"
 "Sleep"
 "617"
 "Heaven"
 "All Better Days"
 "Slipping Into You"
 "Once in a While"

Personnel
BoDeans
 Kurt Neumann – vocals, electric and acoustic guitars, keyboards
 Sam Llanas – vocals, acoustic guitar
 Bob Griffin – bass guitar
Additional personnel
 Michael Ramos – accordion, Hammond B3
 Kevin Leahy - drums, vibraphone
 Nick Kitsos - drums (tracks #7, #12, #13)

References

2004 albums
BoDeans albums
Zoë Records albums